Maud, Abbess of Montivilliers, was a natural daughter of Henry I of England by an unknown mistress. She is not to be confused with Isabel, another illegitimate daughter of Henry I by his mistress Isabel de Beaumont (c. 1102 – c. 1172), herself a sister of Robert de Beaumont, 2nd Earl of Leicester.

Maud (or Mathilda) was a half-sister of the Empress Matilda, who agreed to work with her. She may have valued her company and advice. 

Matilda became the abbess of the Montivilliers Abbey, and for that reason is best known as Maud of Montivilliers.

References 

Year of death missing
Illegitimate children of Henry I of England
12th-century English nuns
Anglo-Norman Roman Catholic abbesses
Year of birth missing
12th-century French nuns
People from Montivilliers
Daughters of kings